Telmo Ramon Languiller-Tornesi (born 31 July 1957) is an Australian politician. He was a Labor Party member of the Victorian Legislative Assembly from 1999 to 2018, representing the electorates of Sunshine (1999–2002), Derrimut (2002–2014) and Tarneit (2014–2018). From December 2014, he was Speaker of the Victorian Legislative Assembly, but was forced to resign in March 2017 for claiming a second house allowance. While entitled to the allowance, it failed the test of public opinion and Languiller was forced to repay the allowance by the Premier. He currently serves as Melbourne Victory FC's  director of international relations.

Parliamentary career
From 1993 to 1996, Languiller was electorate officer for former Deputy Prime Minister Brian Howe, and became Chief of Staff for Andrew Theophanous in 1996 until 1999.

In 1999, he was selected as the Labor candidate for the safe seat of Sunshine, succeeding Ian Baker whom he had beaten in the preselection, and was duly elected. His seat was abolished in 2002 and replaced with Derrimut, which Languiller won. In 2002 he was appointed Parliamentary Secretary for Community Services, and he served as Acting Speaker since 2004. In 2006 he moved to the Parliamentary Secretary for Multicultural Affairs position, and then to Human Services in 2007.

Following the election of the Daniel Andrews Labor government at the 2014 state election, Languiller was elected Speaker of the Victorian Legislative Assembly.

In February 2017, The Age newspaper reported that Languiller had claimed $37,678 in second residence allowances to live in Queenscliff, a considerable distance from his western suburbs electorate of Tarneit. Languiller acknowledged that claiming the allowance had not met "community standards", and offered to repay the money. On 25 February, he resigned as speaker. In January 2018, Victoria Police announced it had conducted an investigation into the allowance claims of Languiller and deputy speaker Don Nardella, and found insufficient evidence to charge either man with an offence.

In August 2017, Languiller announced he was retiring from politics, and would not contest the next election in 2018.

Personal life
Languiller was born in Montevideo, Uruguay, but soon migrated to Australia. He attended high school at Flemington in Victoria, and received a Bachelor of Arts majoring in sociology and politics from Footscray Institute of Technology. He had previously worked as a labourer, a Spanish interpreter, and a trade unionist.

References

External links
 Parliamentary voting record of Telmo Languiller at Victorian Parliament Tracker

1957 births
Living people
Australian Labor Party members of the Parliament of Victoria
Members of the Victorian Legislative Assembly
Speakers of the Victorian Legislative Assembly
Victoria University, Melbourne alumni
Politicians from Montevideo
Uruguayan emigrants to Australia
21st-century Australian politicians
Politicians from Melbourne